The Recording Industry Association of America (RIAA) is a trade organization that represents the music recording industry in the United States. Its members consist of record labels and distributors that the RIAA says "create, manufacture, and/or distribute approximately 85% of all legally sold recorded music in the United States". RIAA is headquartered in Washington, D.C.

RIAA was formed in 1952. Its original mission was to administer recording copyright fees and problems, work with trade unions, and do research relating to the record industry and government regulations. Early RIAA standards included the RIAA equalization curve, the format of the stereophonic record groove and the dimensions of 33 1/3, 45, and 78 rpm records.

RIAA says its current mission includes:
to protect intellectual property rights and the First Amendment rights of artists
to perform research about the music industry
to monitor and review relevant laws, regulations, and policies

Between 2001 and 2020, RIAA spent between $2.4 million and $6.5 million annually on lobbying in the United States. RIAA also participates in the collective rights management of sound recordings, and it is responsible for certifying gold and platinum albums and singles in the United States.

Company structure and sales
Mitch Glazier has been the RIAA's chairman and CEO since 2019. Glazier joined the RIAA 20 years ago and has played a role in the music industry's transition to streaming and "anywhere, anytime" access to music. He was the RIAA's senior executive vice president from 2011 to 2019 and served as executive vice president for public policy and industry relations from 2000 to 2011.

The 26-member board of directors is composed of these record executives:

Mitch Glazier (Recording Industry Association of America)
Michele Ballantyne (Recording Industry Association of America) 
Michele Anthony (Universal Music Group)
Glen Barros (Exceleration Music)
Michael L. Nash  (Universal Music Group)
Eric Berman (Universal Music Group)
David Bither (Nonesuch Records)
Ken Bunt (Disney Music Group)
John Esposito (Warner Music Nashville)
Victor Gonzalez (Universal Music Latin Entertainment)
Camille Hackney (Atlantic Records)
Rani Hancock (Sire Records)
Jeff Harleston (Universal Music Group) 
Terry Hemmings (Provident Music Group/Sony Music Entertainment)
Kevin Kelleher (Sony Music Entertainment)
Sheldra Khahaifa (Sony Music Entertainment)
Dennis Kooker (Sony Music Entertainment)
Eric Chopra (Sony Music Entertainment)
Annie Lee (Interscope Geffen A&M)
Gabriela Maartinez (Warner Music Latina)
Deirdre McDonald (Sony Music Entertainment)
Paul Robinson (Warner Music Group)
Tom Silverman (Tommy Boy Entertainment)
Julie Swidler (Sony Music Entertainment)
Will Tanous (Universal Music Group)
Zena White (Partisan Records)

The RIAA represents over 1,600 member labels, which are private corporate entities such as record labels and distributors, and collectively create and distribute about 90% of recorded music sold in the United States. The largest and most influential of the members are the "Big Three":
 Sony Music Entertainment
 Universal Music Group
 Warner Music Group

Within the major three music groups, it represents high-profile record labels such as Atlantic, Capitol, RCA, Warner Bros., Columbia, and Motown.

The RIAA reports that total retail value of recordings sold by their members was $10.4 billion at the end of 2007, a decline from $14.6 billion in 1999. Estimated retail revenues from recorded music in the United States grew 11.4% in 2016 to $7.7 billion.

Sales certification

The RIAA operates an award program for albums that sell a large number of copies. The award was launched in 1958; originally, the requirement for a Gold single was one million units sold and a Gold album represented $1 million in sales (at wholesale value, around a third of the list price). In 1975, the additional requirement of 500,000 units sold was added for Gold albums. Reflecting growth in record sales, the Platinum award was added in 1976, for albums able to sell one million units, while singles qualify upon selling two million units. The Multi-Platinum award was introduced in 1984, signifying multiple Platinum levels of albums and singles. In 1989, the sales thresholds for singles were reduced to 500,000 for Gold and 1,000,000 for Platinum, reflecting a decrease in sales of singles. In 1992, RIAA began counting each disc in a multi-disc set as one unit toward certification. Reflecting additional growth in music sales, the Diamond award was instituted in 1999 for albums or singles selling ten million units. Because of these changes in criteria, the sales level associated with a particular award depends on when the award was made.

Since 2000,  the RIAA also operates a similar program for Latin music sales, called Los Premios de Oro y De Platino. Currently, a "Disco De Oro" (Gold) is awarded for 30,000 units, and a "Disco De Platino" is awarded for 60,000 units. Further, the "Album Multi-Platino" honor is awarded at 120,000, and "Diamante" requires 10 times as many units as "Platino" (600,000). The RIAA defines "Latin music" as a type of release with 51% or more of its content recorded in Spanish.

"Digital" single certification

In 2004, the RIAA added a branch of certification for what it calls "digital" recordings, essentially referring to "recordings transferred to the recipient over a network" (such as those sold via the iTunes Store) yet excluding other obviously digital media such as those on CD, DAT, or MiniDisc. In 2006, "digital ringtones" were added to this branch of certification.  Starting in 2013, streaming from audio and video streaming services such as Spotify, Napster, YouTube and the likes also began to be counted towards the certification, using the formula of 100 streams being the equivalent of one download; thus, RIAA certification for singles no longer reflects actual sales. In the same year, the RIAA introduced the Latin Digital Award for digital recordings in Spanish.    , the certification criteria for these recordings are:

Digital awards:
Gold: 500,000 units
Platinum: 1,000,000 units
Multi-Platinum: 2,000,000 units (increments of 1,000,000 thereafter)
Diamond: 10,000,000 units

The units are defined as:
 A permanent digital download counts as 1 unit 
 150 on-demand audio and/or video streams count as 1 unit

Latin digital awards:
Disco de Oro (Gold): 30,000 copies
Disco de Platino (Platinum): 60,000 copies
Disco de Multi-Platino (Multi-Platinum): 120,000 copies

Album certification
In February 2016, RIAA updated its certification criteria for album-level awards to combine streaming and track sales using the formula for album-equivalent unit.

Gold: 500,000 units
Platinum: 1,000,000 units
Multi-Platinum: 2,000,000 units (increments of 1,000,000 thereafter)
Diamond: 10,000,000 units

For certification purposes, each unit may be one of:
 sale of a digital album or physical album
 10 track downloads from the album
 1,500 on-demand audio and/or video streams from the album

Video longform certification
Along with albums, digital albums, and singles, another classification of music release is called "video longform". This release format includes DVD and VHS releases. Further, certain live albums and compilation albums are counted. The certification criteria are slightly different from other styles.

Gold: 50,000 copies
Platinum: 100,000 copies
Multi-Platinum: 200,000 copies

Efforts against alleged infringement of members' copyrights

Efforts against file sharing

RIAA opposes unauthorized sharing of its members' music. Studies conducted since the association began its campaign against peer-to-peer file-sharing have concluded that losses incurred per download range from negligible to moderate.

The association has commenced high-profile lawsuits against file-sharing service providers. Likewise, it has sued individuals suspected of file sharing, notably college students, parents of file-sharing children and at least one dead person. It is accused of employing techniques such as peer-to-peer "decoying" and "spoofing" to combat file sharing.

In late 2008, they announced they would stop their lawsuits, and instead attempt to work with ISPs to persuade them to use a three-strike system for file sharing involving issuing two warnings and then cutting off Internet service after the third strike.

Selection of defendants
RIAA names defendants based on ISP identification of the subscriber associated with an IP address, and as such do not know any additional information about a person before they sue. After an Internet subscriber's identity is discovered, but before an individual lawsuit is filed, the subscriber is typically offered an opportunity to settle. The standard settlement is a payment to RIAA and an agreement not to engage in file sharing of music. Such suits are also usually on par with statutory damages of $750 per work, with the RIAA choosing the number of works it deems "reasonable". For cases that do not settle at this amount, the RIAA has gone to trial, seeking statutory damages from the jury, written into The Digital Theft Deterrence and Copyright Damages Improvement Act of 1999 as between $750 and $30,000 per work or $750 and $150,000 per work if "willful".

The Electronic Frontier Foundation and Public Citizen oppose the ability of RIAA and other companies to "strip Internet users of anonymity without allowing them to challenge the order in court". Importantly, US Courts have declared that an IP address is not a person nor personal identifier. This weakened RIAA's ability to sue individuals.

RIAA's methods of identifying individual users had, in some rare cases, led to the issuing of subpoenas to persons dead or otherwise incapable of file-sharing. Two such examples include: a then-recently deceased 83-year-old woman an elderly computer novice, and a family reportedly without any computer at all.

Settlement programs

In February 2007, RIAA began sending letters accusing Internet users of sharing files and directing them to web site P2PLAWSUITS.COM, where they can make "discount" settlements payable by credit card. The letters go on to say that anyone not settling will have lawsuits brought against them. Typical settlements are between $3,000 and $12,000. This new strategy was formed because the RIAA's legal fees were cutting into the income from settlements. In 2008, RIAA sued 19-year-old Ciara Sauro for allegedly sharing 10 songs online.

RIAA also launched an "early settlement program" directed to ISPs and to colleges and universities, urging them to pass along letters to subscribers and students offering early settlements, prior to the disclosure of their identities. The settlement letters urged ISPs to preserve evidence for the benefit of the RIAA and invited the students and subscribers to visit an RIAA website for the purpose of entering into a "discount settlement" payable by credit card. By March 2007, the focus had shifted from ISPs to colleges and universities.

In October 1998, RIAA filed a lawsuit in the Ninth U.S. Court of Appeals in San Francisco claiming the Diamond Multimedia Rio PMP300 player violated the 1992 Audio Home Recording Act. The Rio PMP300 was significant because it was the second portable consumer MP3 digital audio player released on the market. The three-judge panel ruled in favor of Diamond, paving the way for the development of the portable digital player market.

In 2003, RIAA sued college student developers of LAN search engines Phynd and Flatlan, describing them as "a sophisticated network designed to enable widespread music thievery".

In September 2003, RIAA filed suit in civil court against several private individuals who had shared large numbers of files with Kazaa. Most of these suits were settled with monetary payments averaging $3,000. Kazaa publisher Sharman Networks responded with a lawsuit against RIAA, alleging that the terms of use of the network were violated and that unauthorized client software was used in the investigation to track down the individual file sharers (such as Kazaa Lite). An effort to throw out this suit was denied in January 2004, but that suit was settled in 2006. Sharman Networks agreed to a global settlement of litigation brought against it by the Motion Picture Association of America, the International Federation of the Phonographic Industry, and by RIAA. The creators of the popular Kazaa file-sharing network would pay $115 million to RIAA, plus unspecified future amounts to MPAA and the software industry; and, they would install filters on its networks to prevent users from sharing copyrighted works on its network.

RIAA also filed suit in 2006 to enjoin digital XM Satellite Radio from enabling its subscribers from playing songs they had recorded from its satellite broadcasts. It is also suing several Internet radio stations. Later, XM was forced to impose an industry fee upon subscribers. The fee still exists and has always been paid, in-full, directly to RIAA.

On October 12, 2007, RIAA sued Usenet.com seeking a permanent injunction to prevent the company from "aiding, encouraging, enabling, inducing, causing, materially contributing to, or otherwise facilitating" copyright infringement. This suit, the first that RIAA has filed against a Usenet provider, has added another branch to RIAA's rapidly expanding fight to curb the unauthorized distribution of copyrighted materials. Unlike many of RIAA's previous lawsuits, this suit was filed against the provider of a service. Providers have no direct means of removing infringing content. RIAA's argument relies heavily on the fact the Usenet.com, the only defendant that had been named, promoted their service with slogans and phrases that strongly suggested that the service could be used to obtain free music.

On April 28, 2008, RIAA member labels sued Project Playlist, a web music search site, claiming that most of the sound recordings in the site's index of links are infringing. Project Playlist's website denies that any of the music is hosted on Project Playlist's own servers.

On June 30, 2009, RIAA prevailed in its fight against Usenet.com, in a decision, that the U.S. District Judge Harold Baer of the Southern District of New York ruled in favor of the music industry on all its main arguments: that Usenet.com was guilty of direct, contributory, and vicarious infringement. In addition, and perhaps most importantly for future cases, Baer said that Usenet.com cannot claim protection under the Sony Betamax decision. That ruling states that companies cannot be held liable for contributory infringement if the device they create is "capable of significant noninfringing uses". Furthermore, the parties had appealed to a federal court for damage assessments and awards, which could amount to several millions of dollars for the music industry.

On October 26, 2010, RIAA members won a case against LimeWire, a P2P file-sharing network, for illegal distribution of copyrighted works. On October 29, in retaliation, riaa.org was taken offline via denial-of-service attacks executed by members of Operation Payback and Anonymous.

Advocacy

RIAA filed briefs in Allen v. Cooper, which was decided in 2020. The Supreme Court of the United States abrogated the Copyright Remedy Clarification Act as unconstitutional, while RIAA had argued the opposite view.

The "work made for hire" controversy

In 1999, Mitch Glazier, a Congressional staff attorney, inserted, without public notice or comment, substantive language into the final markup of a "technical corrections" section of copyright legislation, classifying many music recordings as "works made for hire", thereby stripping artists of their copyright interests and transferring those interests to their record labels. Shortly afterwards, Glazier was hired as Senior Vice President of Government Relations and Legislative Counsel for the RIAA, which vigorously defended the change when it came to light. The battle over the disputed provision led to the formation of the Recording Artists' Coalition, which successfully lobbied for repeal of the change.

GitHub and youtube-dl takedown request 

On October 23, 2020, the code repository hosting service GitHub (owned by Microsoft) released a DMCA request from RIAA. This request listed the open-source software project youtube-dl (and forks of the project) as copyright violations. The request cited the United States law Title 17 U.S.C. §1201. Critics of this action say that the software library can be used by archivists to download videos of social injustice. According to Parker Higgins, former Director of Copyright Activism at the Electronic Frontier Foundation (EFF), this takedown request was a "throwback threat" analogous to the DeCSS controversy.

NFT takedown requests 

On February 4, 2022, Mitch Glazier swiftly took action against NFT scam site HitPiece. The site had allegedly stole music to mint as NFTs, and host them on their site. Since then, HitPiece has only responded with "We Started The Conversation And We’re Listening." However, their site has not been updated since.

Criticism 

RIAA is heavily criticized for both policy and for their method of suing individuals for copyright infringement. Particularly strong critic-advocates are Internet-based, such as the Electronic Frontier Foundation and Students for Free Culture. To date, RIAA has sued more than 20,000 people in the United States suspected of distributing copyrighted works. Of these, approximately 2,500 were settled pre-trial. Brad Templeton of the Electronic Frontier Foundation has called these types of lawsuits spamigation and implied they are done merely to intimidate people.

Executive leadership of RIAA
Goddard Lieberson 1964–1972 (president)
Stanley Gortikov 1972 - 1987 (president)
Jay Berman 1988-1998 (president and chair)
Hilary Rosen 1998–2001 (president)
Mitch Bainwol 2003-2011 (chairman and CEO)
Cary Sherman 2011–2019 (chairman and CEO)
Mitch Glazier, 2019–present (chairman and CEO)

See also

 Center for Copyright Information
 Federal Communications Commission 
 Global music industry market share data
 International Intellectual Property Alliance
 Music Canada 
 Parental Advisory
 Strategic lawsuit against public participation

References

External links

 
Trade associations based in the United States
Organizations established in 1952
1952 establishments in the United States